The Cranmore Tower is a  tall 19th century folly in the parish of Cranmore, Somerset, England.

The tower was built in 1862-1864, by Thomas Henry Wyatt for John Moore Paget of Cranmore Hall (now part of All Hallows Preparatory School). There is a viewing area at the top with pair of semi-circular headed openings to each face with a restored iron-railed balcony beneath each pair. A similar balcony just over halfway up is continued right round the tower.  It has been designated by English Heritage as a grade II listed building.

In World War II it was used as a lookout tower by the Home Guard and the Royal Corps of Signals.

By 1984 the tower had fallen into disrepair and was sold to Donald Beaton who undertook repairs. During the course of the repairs the remains of a Roman fort with a hoard of coins was discovered adjacent to the tower. In 1988 it was sold again, this time to Nick Ridge who opened it to the public. The tower was then acquired by followers of the Baháʼí Faith. From early 2008 the tower was open to the public, in particular being marketed as a romantic setting for proposals of marriage. The tower and its grounds are is now privately owned and visitors are no longer permitted.

References

Grade II listed buildings in Mendip District
Folly towers in England
Towers in Somerset
Observation towers in the United Kingdom
Buildings and structures completed in 1864
Listed towers in the United Kingdom